Elections were held in Grey County, Ontario on October 25, 2010 in conjunction with municipal elections across the province.

Grey County Council

The Blue Mountains

Chatsworth

Georgian Bluffs

Grey Highlands

Hanover

Meaford

Owen Sound

Southgate

West Grey

2010 Ontario municipal elections
Grey County